The Regional Council of Apulia (Consiglio Regionale della Puglia) is the legislative assembly of Apulia.

It was first elected in 1970, when the ordinary regions were instituted, on the basis of the Constitution of Italy of 1948.

Composition
The Regional Council of Apulia was originally composed of 50 regional councillors. The number of regional councillors increased to 60 in 2000 and subsequently to 70 in 2005, following a modification of the regional Statute in 2004. In the 2005 regional election the number of councillors further raised to 78, following a further allocation of 8 regional councillors to the center-left winning coalition.

Following the decree-law n. 138 of 13 August 2011 the number of regional councillors returned to 50, with an additional seat reserved for the President of the Region.

Political groups
The Regional Council of Apulia is currently composed of the following political groups:

See also
Regional council
Politics of Apulia
President of Apulia

References

External links
Regional Council of Apulia

Politics of Apulia
Italian Regional Councils
Apulia